Liridon Osmanaj (born 4 January 1992) is a Slovenian footballer who plays for Black Stars Basel. As a youngster he was a prolific goalscorer with Maribor's youth team and even attracted the interest of Chelsea, where he went on trial as a teenager.

Club career

Osmanaj went on trial with Albanian Superliga club Partizani Tirana on 14 August 2014, which proved to be a successful one as he was offered a contract with the club and he signed a week later.

He played with Widzew Łódź in the Polish I liga.

On 10 January 2017, he joined Al-Shamal Sports Club in Qatar.

References

External links
 

1992 births
Living people
Slovenian people of Albanian descent
Sportspeople from Maribor
Slovenian footballers
Slovenia youth international footballers
Association football forwards
Slovenian expatriate footballers
Slovenian expatriate sportspeople in Albania
Expatriate footballers in Albania
Slovenian expatriate sportspeople in Poland
Expatriate footballers in Poland
Expatriate footballers in Qatar
Slovenian expatriate sportspeople in Switzerland
Expatriate footballers in Switzerland
NK Maribor players
NK Domžale players
NK Aluminij players
FK Partizani Tirana players
Widzew Łódź players
NK Radomlje players
Al-Shamal SC players
Slovenian PrvaLiga players
Slovenian Second League players
Kategoria Superiore players
I liga players
Qatari Second Division players